The 2014 Georgia Bulldogs football team represented the University of Georgia in the 2014 NCAA Division I FBS football season. They were led by head coach Mark Richt, who was in his 14th year as head coach. The Bulldogs played their home games at Sanford Stadium. They were a member of the Eastern Division of the Southeastern Conference (SEC). Georgia finished the season with a 10–3 overall record, 6–2 in SEC play placing second place in the East Division. They earned an invitation to play in the Belk Bowl against the Louisville Cardinals, which they won, 37–14.

Rivalry Games
Georgia finished the year 1–2 in rivalry games, losing to Florida 38–20 in the Florida–Georgia football rivalry on November 1, 2014. They beat the Auburn Tigers 34–7. Georgia lost to in-state rival Georgia Tech in Clean, Old-Fashioned Hate on November 29, 2014 by a score of 30–24 in overtime.

Coaching changes
On January 12 defensive coordinator Todd Grantham left to take the same position at Louisville under Bobby Petrino.  On January 14, Georgia hired Jeremy Pruitt as their new defensive coordinator. Pruitt came from Florida State where they were the national champions in 2013. Pruitt had been a part of the previous three national championships as a coach: 2013 at Florida State and 2011 and 2012 at Alabama as secondary coach. Georgia also added three other coaches to their defensive staff: Tracy Rocker, Mike Ekeler, and Kevin Sherrer.

Personnel

Coaching staff

Schedule

Schedule Source:

Rankings

References

Georgia
Georgia Bulldogs football seasons
Duke's Mayo Bowl champion seasons
Georgia Bulldogs football